Karin Baur is a Swiss mathematician who is working in the mathematical fields algebra, representation theory, cluster algebras, cluster categories, combinatorics, Lie algebras. Currently she is a professor at University of Leeds and she also a full professor at University of Graz. From 2007–2012 she has been an assistant professor (SNSF professor) at ETH Zurich. Moreover, she is one of the protagonists of the project Women of Mathematics throughout Europe.

Recognition 
In 2018 Baur was awarded a Royal Society Wolfson Fellowship for her work on Surface categories and mutation.

For her project Orbit Structures in Representation Spaces, she won an SNSF Professorship in 2007.

Publications

References

External links 

 Karin Baur's webpage at the University of Leeds
 Karin Baur's webpage at the University of Graz
 

Year of birth missing (living people)
Living people
Swiss mathematicians
Women mathematicians
Academic staff of the University of Graz
University of Basel alumni